Richard Oetzel (July 12, 1901 – March 9, 1985) was a German politician of the Christian Democratic Union (CDU) and former member of the German Bundestag.

Life 
He joined the CDU in 1946 and was elected to the regional executive of the CDU Westphalia. He was a member of the German Bundestag from 24 January 1953, when he succeeded the retired member Friedrich Holzapfel, until 1965. He entered parliament in all election periods via the North Rhine-Westphalia state list.

Literature

References

1901 births
1985 deaths
Members of the Bundestag for North Rhine-Westphalia
Members of the Bundestag 1961–1965
Members of the Bundestag 1957–1961
Members of the Bundestag 1953–1957
Members of the Bundestag 1949–1953
Members of the Bundestag for the Christian Democratic Union of Germany